Gunthorpe may refer to the following places in England:

 Gunthorpe, Peterborough, Cambridgeshire
 Gunthorpe, Lincolnshire
 Gunthorpe, Norfolk
 Gunthorpe, Nottinghamshire
 Gunthorpe, Rutland